The Regional Municipality of Waterloo, Ontario, Canada has a mixed style of buildings originally located in small towns and farming communities starting from the 19th century. After 1900, commercial and industrial buildings also appeared.

1810s

1830s

1840s

1850s

1860s

1870s

1880s

1890s

1900s

1910s

1920s

1930s

1950s

Dates unknown

See also

 List of historic places in Regional Municipality of Waterloo
 List of oldest buildings in Canada
 Architecture of Canada

References

Buildings and structures in the Regional Municipality of Waterloo
Waterloo Region
History of the Regional Municipality of Waterloo